The 2023 Benedict Tigers volleyball team, the second ever Benedict men's volleyball team represents Benedict College in the 2023 NCAA Division I & II men's volleyball season. The Tigers, led by second year head coach Gwendolyn Rouse, play their home games at HRC Arena. The Tigers compete as members of the Southern Intercollegiate Athletic Conference. Benedict was picked to finish third in the 2023 SIAC preseason poll.

Season highlights
Will be filled in as the season progresses.

Roster

Schedule
TV/Internet Streaming information:
All home games will be streamed on HBCU League Pass+. Most road games will also be streamed by the schools streaming service.

 *-Indicates conference match.
 Times listed are Eastern Time Zone.

Announcers for televised games
Truett McConnell: 
Truett McConnell: 
Reinhardt: 
Morehouse: 
Central State: 
Erskine: 
Central State: 
Kentucky State: 
Edward Waters:
Morehouse: 
Reinhardt: 
Fort Valley State: 
Edward Waters: 
Carolina: 
Carolina: 
Fort Valley State:

References

2023 in sports in South Carolina
Benedict
2023 Southern Intercollegiate Athletic Conference men's volleyball season